Municipal elections were held in Finland on 24 October 2004, with advance voting between 13 and 19 October. 11,966 municipal council seats were open for election in 416 municipalities.

National results

References

Municipal elections in Finland
Municipal
Finland